The Seefestspiele Mörbisch, originally: Seespiele Mörbisch, is an annual operetta festival in Mörbisch am See (Austria). With around 150,000 visitors, the Mörbisch Lake Festival is the world's largest festival of the operetta genre. In addition to operettas, classical musicals are also performed on an irregular basis. Above all, the natural scenery of Neusiedler See is always incorporated into the stage set. The area is very flat, so transmission technology specially developed for the Lake Festival is used.

History

Economic-touristic foundations 
The creation and development of the Seespiele Mörbisch was dominated by considerations of tourism policy. When, from 1953 onwards, efforts were made to develop Burgenland's tourism and to transform the visiting and transit area into a place to stay and relax, Lake Neusiedl and the lakeside communities were at the centre of these efforts. In the municipality of Mörbisch am See, the road between Rust and Mörbisch was extended with strong support from the tourism department, an 1800 m long lake dam, which opened up Lake Neusiedl to visitors from Mörbisch, was built and a lido was constructed. Mörbisch became the fourth important tourist community on the lake, alongside Rust, Neusiedl am See and Podersdorf am See. In 1956, the people of Mörbisch invited to a two-day Seefest. The programme offered night rides in decorated motorboats, music was provided by dance bands, Viennese artists performed a complete cabaret programme, and folk song and dance groups also performed.

In 1957, the Burgenland press announced the first highlight of the development of Mörbisch into a Burgenland tourist centre through the construction of a lakeside hotel.. und der Abhaltung von Seespielen an und damit verbunden den Beginn eines neuen Abschnitts burgenländischen Wirtschafts- und Kulturaufstiegs.

Foundation, technical equipment 
The initiative for the Seespiele, founded in the years 1955–1957, came from the celebrated chamber singer Herbert Alsen (among others) at the Vienna State Opera (1906–1978), who, together with his wife, the costume designer Gisela Bossert (†2012), who had worked in Berlin, discovered the venue by chance while looking for a holiday location that was climatically conducive to his voice, and whom the peculiar musicality of this landscape permanently touched. Alsen's plans found favour with the municipal council of Mörbisch as well as with the representative of the province,   (1899–1974), especially as the project fitted into the tourism concept of the municipality and the province, and Alsen subsequently agreed to take over the directorship of the Seespiele for an initial period of five years (with reference to possible competition with the Bregenz Festivals), stressing that the Seespiele in Mörbisch did not want to be a festival that would add to the excessive number of festival venues.

After two years of preparation, the opening took place on 6 July 1957 with the operetta The Gypsy Baron by Johann Strauss II.

The lake stage was built in a bay next to the Mörbisch bathing beach on many hundreds of piles according to the plans of architect  (1915–2008), the designer of the first Bregenz lake stage. Its dimensions were 42 by 20 m; the auditorium, created by filling in the lake, contained 1,500 Seating capacity. After an extension in 1959, 3000 people could be accommodated. Today the auditorium has over 6000 seats. In the following years, due to the great audience response, there were constant expansions, both in terms of the number of performances and the size of the auditorium and stage. From an initial six performances with about 7000 spectators (1957), the number increased to over 30 performances in July and August.

This makes directional listening possible despite the size of the stage.
For several years the premiere of the Seefestspiele was broadcast by the ORF. With the 2013 season, however, this practice was ended.

In 2018, specially staged performances for children were shown for the first time. A one-hour adaptation of Countess Mariza was shown in June 2018 on a stage set up on the festival grounds for a total of six performances. Up to 250 children were seated at each performance, and visitors were also given the opportunity to sing and dance along. The aim was to bring operetta closer to the children. The same soloists were on stage as in the regular performances.

Director of the Mörbisch Lake Festival since its foundation 
 1957–1978: Herbert Alsen (intendant), Franziska Schurli (December 1919, 21 January 1984) (managing Director)
 1979–1980: Fred Liewehr (artistic director), Franziska Schurli (managing director)
 1981–1983: Franziska Schurli (artistic director and managing director)
 1984–1989:  (artistic director) Heinrich Meyer (managing director)
 1990–1992:  (intendant), Josef Wiedenhofer (managing director).
 1993–2012:  (artistic director), Dietmar Posteiner (managing director).
 2013–2017: Dagmar Schellenberger (artistic director), Dietmar Posteiner (managing director)
 since 2018: Peter Edelmann. (artistic director), Dietmar Posteiner (managing director), since 2021 additionally  as General Music Director of Burgenland. 

From 1995 to 2008, Rudolf Bibl was musical director, and was appointed honorary member of the festival in 2013.

Performances, artists

Performances 
With a total of twelve seasons, The Gypsy Baron is by far the most frequently performed operetta in Mörbisch.

The 2020 Festival had to be cancelled due to the COVID-19 pandemic in Austria. The production of West Side Story planned for 2020 was postponed to 2021. The stage decoration includes a 14 m high Statue of Liberty and the typical Manhattan brick buildings with fire escape, water elevator and neon advertising sign Nylon on the roof.

Artists who have performed so far 

 Marina Alsen, 1964, 1967, 2015
 Anja-Nina Bahrmann, 2006
 Sari Barabas, 1960, 1961, 1964, 1967
 Rosy Barsony, 1967
 [Verena Barth-Jurca, 2015, 2016
 Erwin Belakowitsch, 2013, 2014
 Helmut Berger-Tuna, 1998, 2000
 Rupert Bergmann, 2013, 2014
 Alfred Böhm, 1977, 1982
 Henryk Böhm, 2013
 Kurt Böhme, 1975
 Christian Boesch, 1969
 Jochen Brockmann, 1976
 Rudolf Carl, 1959, 1964, 1968
 Heinz Conrads, 1971
 Rudolf Christ, 1967, 1968
 Dorothea Chryst, 1974
 Ciro de Luca, 2010
 Karl Dönch, 1974, 1978, 1979, 1980
 Rui dos Santos, 2013, 2016
 Nigel Douglas. 1964
 Felix Dvorak, 1978, 1981
 Peter Edelmann, 1996
 Gerhard Ernst, 1991, 2004, 2014, 2017
 Heinz Ehrenfreund, 1976, 1980
 Richard Eybner, 1975
 Sieglinde Feldhofer, 2010, 2012, 2017
 Rainhard Fendrich, 2008
 Günther Frank, 1972, 1973
 Harry Friedauer, 1959
 Gail Gilmore, 1979, 1981
 Franz Glawatsch jun., 1957, 1958, 1959
 Walter Goldschmidt, 1970, 1971, 1972, 1974, 1975
 Hugo Gottschlich, 1978, 1979
 Kurt Großkurth, 1970, 1971
 Ingrid Habermann, 1999, 2013, 2014
 Harry Hardt, 1976
 Johannes Heesters, 1973
 Robert Herzl, 1974
 Sylvia Holzmayer, 1977
 Kurt Huemer, 1977, 1978, 1979
 Mirjana Irosch, 1976, 1980, 1981, 1987, 1993, 1995, 2005
 Gundula Janowitz, 1987
 Peter Josch, 1979
 Elisabeth Kales, 1982, 1985, 1986, 1989, 1993
 Marko Kathol, 2004, 2006, 2010
 Waldemar Kmentt, 1980
 Dagmar Koller, 1977, 1982, 1985
 Ossy Kolmann, 1974, 1976, 1988
 Johannes Martin Kränzle, 1995
 Horst Lamnek, 2017, 2018
 Peter Lesiak 2016
 Marika Lichter, 1998
 Fred Liewehr, 1977
 Herbert Lippert, 1994, 2012, 2015
 Helmut Lohner, 2009, 2012
 Guggi Löwinger, 1960, 1970, 1971, 1973
 Mark Roy Luykx, 2021
 Michael Maertens, 2009
 Sigrid Martikke, 1973, 1974, 1975
 Iva Mihanovic, 2007
 Peter Minich, 1974, 1976, 1978
 Corneliu Murgu, 1980
 Nera Nicol, 1973
 Klaus Ofczarek, 1969
 Helga Papouschek, 1965, 1976, 1978
 Stephan Paryla, 2003, 2014
 Barbara Payha, 1997
 Olaf Plassa, 2013, 2014
 Linda Plech, 2011, 2013
 Herbert Prikopa, 1958, 1988, 1991, 1992
 Joesi Prokopetz, 2015
 Elena Puszta, 2015, 2017
 Else Rambausek, 1959, 1961, 1963
 Sebastian Reinthaller, 1998
 Elfriede Ramhapp, 1958, 1974
 Alexandra Reinprecht, 2010, 2012
 Mirko Roschkowski, 2013, 2015
 Helge Rosvaenge, 1958
 Lotte Rysanek, 1958
 Johannes Schauer, 1980
 Dagmar Schellenberger, 2004, 2005, 2014, 2015, 2016, 2017
 Vera Schoenenberg, 2002
 Marianne Schönauer, 1970, 1989, 1990
 Ingeborg Schöpf, 2008
 Gretl Schörg, 1976
 Margit Schramm, 1971
 Nikolai Schukoff, 2004
 Friedrich-W. Schwardtmann, 2003, 2007, 2010
 Paul Schweinester, 2017
 Daniel Serafin, 2007, 2009, 2011, 2012
 Harald Serafin, 1969, 2012
 Martina Serafin, 1994, 1995, 1997, 1998, 2000
 Tiberius Simu, 2010
 Franziska Stanner, 2013, 2014
 Ulrike Steinsky, 1988, 1989, 1994
 Rudolf Strobl, 1978
 Ernst-Dieter Suttheimer, 1981, 2015
 Helga Thieme, 1980
 Maria Tiboldi, 1972
 Vico Torriani, 1972
 Jeffrey Traganza, 2015, 2016
 Natalia Ushakova, 2003
 Ljuba Welitsch, 1969, 1970, 1971
 Vida Mikneviciute, 2018
 Karl Winkler, 1957
 Roman Payer, 2018
 Andreja Zidaric, 2021
 Grete Zimmer, 1978, 1979

Notes and references

Notes

References

Sources
 Maria Awecker, Sabine Schmall, Heinz Hischenhuber (ed.), Margret Dietrich (ed.): Theatergeschichte des Burgenlandes von 1921 bis zur Gegenwart. Theatergeschichte Österreichs, vol. 8: Burgenland, fascicule 2, . Österreichischen Akademie der Wissenschaften Press, Vienna 1995, – table of content (PDF).

Further reading 
 Eva Deissen (ed.): Mörbisch – ein Festival schreibt Operettengeschichte. Begleitmaterialien: CD. Echomedia-Verlag, Vienna 2007, .

External links 

 

Music festivals in Austria
Festivals in Vorarlberg
Tourist attractions in Burgenland
1957 establishments in Austria
Music festivals established in 1957
Opera festivals